Bruno Götze (21 June 1882 – 28 May 1913) was a German cyclist. He won a silver medal at the 1906 Intercalated Games and competed in four events at the 1908 Summer Olympics.

References

External links
 

1882 births
1913 deaths
German male cyclists
Olympic cyclists of Germany
Cyclists at the 1906 Intercalated Games
Cyclists at the 1908 Summer Olympics
Sportspeople from Wrocław
People from the Province of Silesia
Medalists at the 1906 Intercalated Games
Cyclists from Berlin
20th-century German people